Three human polls and one formula ranking made up the 2013 NCAA Division I FBS (Football Bowl Subdivision) football rankings, in addition to various publications' preseason polls. Unlike most sports, college football's governing body, the NCAA, does not bestow a national championship title. That title is bestowed by one or more of four different polling agencies. There are two main weekly polls that begin in the preseason—the AP Poll and the Coaches Poll. Two additional polls were released midway through the season; the Harris Interactive Poll was released after the sixth week of the season, and the Bowl Championship Series (BCS) standings were released after the seventh week. The Harris Poll and Coaches Poll were factors in the BCS standings. At the end of the season, on Sunday, December 1, 2013, the BCS standings determined who played in the BCS bowl games as well as the 2014 BCS National Championship Game on January 6, 2014, at the Rose Bowl in Pasadena, California.

Legend

AP Poll

Coaches Poll

Harris Interactive Poll

BCS Standings

References

Rankings
NCAA Division I FBS football rankings
Bowl Championship Series